The 2019 UEFA Super Cup was the 44th edition of the UEFA Super Cup, an annual football match organised by UEFA and contested by the reigning champions of the two main European club competitions, the UEFA Champions League and the UEFA Europa League. The match featured two English sides, Liverpool, the winners of the 2018–19 UEFA Champions League, and Chelsea, the winners of the 2018–19 UEFA Europa League. The match was played at Vodafone Park in Istanbul, Turkey on 14 August 2019. The match was the first all-English UEFA Super Cup, and the eighth overall Super Cup to feature two teams from the same country. For the first time, the video assistant referee (VAR) system was used in the competition.

Liverpool won the match 5–4 on penalties following a 2–2 draw after extra time for their fourth UEFA Super Cup title. As winners, Liverpool were rewarded £4 million in prize money.

Teams

Venue

This was the first UEFA Super Cup held in Turkey, and the third time a UEFA club competition final was held in the country, after the 2005 UEFA Champions League Final at the Atatürk Olympic Stadium and the 2009 UEFA Cup Final at the Şükrü Saracoğlu Stadium, both also in Istanbul.

The stadium is the home ground of Turkish club Beşiktaş. UEFA regulations regarding naming rights of non-tournament sponsors required that the stadium be referred to as Beşiktaş Park in all UEFA materials.

Host selection
For the first time ever, an open bidding process was launched on 9 December 2016 by UEFA to select the venues of the club competition finals (UEFA Champions League, UEFA Europa League, UEFA Women's Champions League, and UEFA Super Cup). Associations had until 27 January 2017 to express interest, and bid dossiers had to be submitted by 6 June 2017.

UEFA announced on 3 February 2017 that nine associations expressed interest in hosting, and confirmed on 7 June 2017 that seven associations submitted bids for the 2019 UEFA Super Cup:

The following associations expressed interest in hosting but eventually did not submit bids:
Hungary: Groupama Arena, Budapest
Scotland: Hampden Park, Glasgow

The bid evaluation report was published by UEFA on 14 September 2017. Vodafone Park was selected as the venue by the UEFA Executive Committee on 20 September 2017.

Background
The match was the first UEFA Super Cup to feature two English teams, after all-English finals in both of UEFA's seasonal tournaments; Liverpool beat Tottenham Hotspur in the Champions League and Chelsea beat Arsenal in the Europa League. The match was the eighth overall Super Cup to feature two teams from the same country, previously achieved five times by Spanish teams (2006, 2014, 2015, 2016 and 2018) and twice by Italian teams (1990 and 1993). This also ensured that it would be the first Super Cup to be won by an English team since Liverpool in 2005.

This was the eleventh meeting between both clubs in UEFA competition. Liverpool and Chelsea were drawn against each other in five successive Champions League seasons between 2004–05 and 2008–09. Chelsea had won three of these meetings (including one after extra time) to Liverpool's two, with the other five ending in draws (including one decided on penalties in Liverpool's favour). Each side had advanced against the other two times apiece, with the other tie coming in the 2005–06 UEFA Champions League group stage as Liverpool's unique qualifying situation that season did not grant them association protection.

The teams have met twice previously in domestic cup finals, which Chelsea have triumphed on both occasions. First was in the 2005 Football League Cup Final, played outside England at the Millennium Stadium in Wales while Wembley Stadium was being rebuilt, where they won 3–2 after extra time, and more recently in the 2012 FA Cup Final at Wembley, winning 2–1.  They both also contested the English super cup, the FA Community Shield, in 2006 and Liverpool won 2–1 on that occasion at Cardiff's Millennium Stadium.

Match

Officials

On 2 August 2019, UEFA named French official Stéphanie Frappart as the referee for the match, marking the first time in history a woman would referee the final of a UEFA men's competition. Frappart has been a FIFA referee since 2009, and had officiated at the 2019 FIFA Women's World Cup in the month prior, where she was appointed as the referee for the final. She also previously officiated at the 2015 FIFA Women's World Cup, 2016 Summer Olympics and UEFA Women's Euro 2017, and became the first woman to referee in Ligue 1 in April 2019. Her compatriot Manuela Nicolosi was chosen as one of the assistant referees, along with Irish official Michelle O'Neill, while Cüneyt Çakır of Turkey was chosen as the fourth official. French referee Clément Turpin was named the video assistant referee, presiding over the first use of the technology in the UEFA Super Cup. His fellow countryman François Letexier was named as one of the assistant video assistant referees for the match, along with Massimiliano Irrati of Italy, while Mark Borsch of Germany offside VAR.

Summary

Chelsea took the lead after 36 minutes when a pass from Christian Pulisic played in Olivier Giroud on the left and his first-time left-foot shot found the right corner of the net. Pulisic had a second goal ruled out shortly after for offside after confirmation from VAR. Sadio Mané made it 1–1 after 48 minutes when he scored from close range at the second attempt after a flick past the goalkeeper from substitute Roberto Firmino. The match went to extra time and Sadio Mané got his second goal of the match in the 95th minute with a side-foot into the top right-hand corner of the net after Roberto Firmino found him with a cut-back from the left.

Chelsea were awarded a penalty six minutes later when Adrián was adjudged to have brought down Tammy Abraham when he ran onto a pass in the penalty area. Jorginho scored to make it 2–2 with a low shot to the right corner. The match went to a penalty shoot-out and with the score at 5–4 Tammy Abraham saw his low shot saved by Adrián with his right leg to win the game for Liverpool.

Details
The Champions League winners were designated as the "home" team for administrative purposes.

Statistics

See also
2019 UEFA Champions League Final
2019 UEFA Europa League Final
Chelsea F.C. in international football
English football clubs in international competitions
List of football matches between British clubs in UEFA competitions
Liverpool F.C. in international football

References

External links

2019 UEFA Super Cup: Istanbul, UEFA.com

2019
Super Cup
Super Cup
August 2019 sports events in Turkey
Super Cup 2019
Super Cup 2019
Super Cup
2019
International club association football competitions hosted by Turkey
2019 in Istanbul
UEFA Super Cup 2013